Tauernkogel is the name of the following mountains in Austria:
 
 (Felber) Tauernkogel (Venediger Group) (2,988 m), near the Felber Tauern pass in the Venediger Group, Salzburg–Tyrolean border
 (Krimmler) Tauernkogel (Zillertal Alps) (2,872 m), near the Krimmler Tauern pass in the eastern Zillertal Alps, Salzburg–South Tyrolean border
 (Kalser) Tauernkogel (Granatspitze Group) (2,683 m), near the Kalser Tauern pass in the Granatspitze Group, Salzburg–Tyrolean border
 Tauernkogel (Tennen Mountains) (2,247 m), in the Tennen Mountains in the state of Salzburg